Puerto Rican may refer to:

Something of or related to Puerto Rico, an archipelago located in the Caribbean and an unincorporated territory of the United States
 Puerto Ricans, people from Puerto Rico, the inhabitants and citizens of Puerto Rico, and their descendants
 Puerto Rican cuisine
 Puerto Rican culture
 Puerto Rican Spanish
 SS Puerto Rican, an oil tanker that exploded in 1984

See also 
 Demographics of Puerto Rico